The  was held on 4 February 1983 in Yokohama Citizens Hall, Yokohama, Kanagawa, Japan.

Awards
 Best Film: Tenkōsei
 Best Actor: Ryudo Uzaki (宇崎竜童) – Tattoo Ari
 Best Actress: Ayumi Ishida – Yaju-deka
 Best New Actress:
Reiko Nakamura – Mizu no Nai Pool
Satomi Kobayashi – Tenkōsei
 Best Supporting Actor: Mitsuru Hirata – Fall Guy
 Best Supporting Actress: Masako Natsume – Dai Nippon Teikoku
 Best Director: Banmei Takahashi - Tattoo Ari
 Best New Director: Shun Nakahara – Okasare Shigan
 Best Screenplay: Wataru Kenmochi – Tenkōsei
 Best Cinematography: Masaki Tamura – Farewell to the Land, Nippon-koku Furuyashiki-mura
 Best Independent Film: Yami Utsu Shinzō
 Special Prize:
Keiko Matsuzaka (Career)
Nobuo Nakagawa (Career)

Best 10
 Tenkōsei
 Fall Guy
 Tattoo Ari
 Farewell to the Land
 Weekend Shuffle
 Mizu no Nai Pool
 To Trap a Kidnapper
 Highteen Boogie
 Cabaret Diary
 Sailor Suit and Machine Gun
runner-up: Yaju-deka

References

Yokohama Film Festival
Yokohama Film Festival
Yokohama Film Festival
Yokohama Film Festival